This list of Nobel laureates affiliated with Columbia University as alumni or faculty comprehensively shows alumni (graduates and attendees) or faculty members (professors of various ranks, researchers, and visiting lecturers or professors) affiliated with Columbia University in New York City who were awarded the Nobel Prize or the Nobel Memorial Prize in Economic Sciences. People who have given public lectures, talks or non-curricular seminars; studied as non-degree students; received honorary degrees; or served as administrative staff at the university are excluded from the list. Summer school attendees and visitors are generally excluded from the list, since summer terms are not part of formal academic years; the same rule applies to the extension school.

Alumni or faculty members of Barnard College after 1900 and Bard College by 1944 are included in the list. Physicians and long-term medical staff of the Mary Imogene Bassett Hospital are included in the list.

The Nobel Prizes, established by the 1895 will of Alfred Nobel, are awarded to individuals who make outstanding contributions in the fields of Chemistry, Literature, Peace, Physics, and Physiology or Medicine. An associated prize, the Sveriges Riksbank Prize in Economic Sciences in Memory of Alfred Nobel (commonly known as the Nobel Prize in Economics), was instituted by Sweden's central bank, Sveriges Riksbank, in 1968 and was first awarded in 1969.

As of the 2022 awards, 101 Nobel laureates have been affiliated with Columbia University as alumni or faculty. Among the 101 laureates, 71 are Nobel laureates in natural sciences; 45 are Columbia alumni (graduates and attendees) and 33 have been long-term academic members of the Columbia faculty; and subject-wise, 33 laureates have won the Nobel Prize in Physics, more than any other subject. This list considers Nobel laureates as equal individuals and does not consider their various prize shares or if they received the prize more than once.

Summary 

All types of affiliations, namely alumni and faculty members, count equally in the following table and throughout the whole page.

In the following list, the number following a person's name is the year they received the prize; in particular, a number with asterisk (*) means the person received the award while they were working at Columbia University (including emeritus staff). A name marked with a dagger (†) indicates that this person has already been listed in a previous category (i.e., multiple affiliations).

Nobel laureates by category

Nobel laureates in Physics

Nobel laureates in Chemistry

Nobel laureates in Physiology or Medicine

Nobel Memorial Prize laureates in Economics

Nobel laureates in Literature

Nobel Peace Prize laureates

Some visitors not qualified as faculty members 
Visiting positions such as the "Global Fellowship" of SIPA and "Earnest Kempton Adams (EKA) Lectureship" at Columbia do not require employment-level duties, and thus are excluded from this list. The EKA Fund was established in 1904, enabling Columbia to invite scientists to deliver a series of public lectures. 

Affiliates during the Manhattan Project, the scientific research project which developed the first nuclear weapons, who specifically worked for the military are also excluded from this list.

Notes

References 

Columbia University people
Columbia University
Nobel
Lists of people by university or college in New York City